The 2014 Women's Premier Soccer League season is the 18th season of the WPSL.  A total of 72 clubs across 7 conferences and 12 divisions participated in the season.  The Houston Aces made it to their second consecutive WPSL final, but again lost by one goal to a Pac-South team, this time Beach Futbol Club.  Beach FC's 16-0 season in a WPSL record, surpassing the 14-0 record set by Ajax America Women in 2007.

Changes from 2013

Conference/division shifts
The Big Sky North division was dissolved, teams transferring to either the Pacific or new Big Sky conference
The two divisions of the Northwest conference were consolidated together
The Midwest conference split into two divisions, "Central" and "Great Lakes"

New/returning teams

Folded/moved teams

Folded:
Ajax America Women
Bend Timbers
Central California HEAT
Emerald City FC
Fort Wayne FC
Indiana United
Kansas City Shock
New Jersey Blaze
Philadelphia Fever
Quad City Eagles
Spokane Shine
St. George United
Texas FC
Tidewater Sharks
United FC Binghamton
Utah Starzz

Merged:
Storm Sacramento and Storm Elk Grove (back) into California Storm
Moved to W-League:
Gulf Coast Texans
Provisional status:
Lancaster Inferno
Removed midseason:
Lions Swarm

Playoffs

References

Women's Premier Soccer League seasons
United States Adult Soccer Association leagues
2